Fury Records was set up by Bobby Robinson in 1957. In 1959 it had a Billboard No.1 hit with Kansas City, sung by Wilbert Harrison.  In the early 1970s, it  helped launch Grandmaster Flash.

See also 
 List of record labels
Fury Records artists

Defunct record labels of the United States
Record labels established in 1957